The Ambassador Extraordinary and Plenipotentiary of Ukraine to Hungary is the ambassador of Ukraine to Hungary. The current ambassador is Mykhailo Yunher (Chargés d'affaires ad interim). He assumed the position in 2014. 

The first Ukrainian ambassador to Hungary assumed his post in 1992, the same year a Ukrainian embassy opened in Budapest. Until 2004 the post was responsible for the Ukrainian embassy in Slovenia.

List of ambassadors

Ukrainian People's Republic
 1919–1919 Roman Yarosevych
 1919–1920 Mykola Galagan
 1920–1920 Lutsiy Kobyliansky (Charge d'Affairs)
 1920–1921 Volodymyr Sikevych

Ukraine
 1992–1998 Dmytro Tkach (coincidentally to Slovenia)
 1998–2002 Orest Klimpush (coincidentally to Slovenia)
 2002–2003 Vasyl Durdynets (coincidentally to Slovenia)
 2003–2006 Yuriy Mushka
 2006–2010 Dmytro Tkach
 2010–2014 Yuriy Mushka
 Since 2014 Mykhailo Yunher (Chargés d'affaires ad interim)

External links 
  Embassy of Ukraine to Hungary: Previous Ambassadors

 
Hungary
Ukraine